Daniel Georges Marc Baudouin is a Canadian former diplomat. He was concurrently appointed as Ambassador Extraordinary and Plenipotentiary to Democratic Republic of Congo, Rwanda, and Zaire. He was then appointed to Burundi, Morocco, and Turkey.

External links 
 Foreign Affairs and International Trade Canada Complete List of Posts

Year of birth missing (living people)
Living people
Ambassadors of Canada to the Democratic Republic of the Congo
Ambassadors of Canada to Rwanda
Ambassadors of Canada to Turkey
Ambassadors of Canada to Morocco
Ambassadors of Canada to Burundi